The Berliner Zeitung (Berlin Newspaper) is a daily newspaper based in Berlin, Germany. Founded in East Germany in 1945, it is the only East German paper to achieve national prominence since reunification. It is published by Berliner Verlag.

History and profile

Berliner Zeitung was first published on 21 May 1945 in East Berlin. The paper, a center-left daily, is published by Berliner Verlag. After the fall of the Berlin Wall, the paper was bought by Gruner + Jahr and the British publisher Robert Maxwell. Gruner + Jahr later became sole owners and relaunched it in 1997 with a completely new design. A stated goal was to turn the Berliner Zeitung into "Germany's Washington Post". The daily says its journalists come "from east and west", and it styles itself as a "young, modern and dynamic" paper for the whole of Germany. It is the only East German paper to achieve national prominence since reunification. In 2003, the Berliner was Berlin's largest subscription newspaper—the weekend edition sells approximately 207,800 copies, with a readership of 468,000. The current editor-in-chief is Brigitte Fehrle.

Gruner + Jahr decided to leave the newspaper business and sold the Berliner Zeitung in 2002 to the publishing group Georg von Holtzbrinck. This sale was blocked by the German antitrust authorities since Holtzbrinck already owned another major Berlin newspaper, Der Tagesspiegel. The Berliner Zeitung was then sold in the fall of 2005 for an estimated 150–180 million euros to the British company Mecom Group and the American company Veronis Suhler Stevenson. The employees criticized this sale vehemently, fearing that journalistic quality could suffer as a result of excessive profit expectations by Mecom boss David Montgomery.

The Berliner Zeitung was the first German newspaper to fall under the control of foreign investors. Andrew Marr, former editor of The Independent, which like the Berliner Zeitung was taken over by David Montgomery, said of the Berliner Zeitung that "[a]nyone who was working at The Independent in the mid to late Nineties will find all this wearisomely familiar. David's obsession at that time was removing as much traditional reporting as possible from the paper and turning it into a tabloid-style scandal sheet for yuppies."

On 23 March 2009, it was announced that the Berliner Verlag would be sold by Mecom to the publisher M. DuMont Schauberg (MDS) in Cologne. The price was about 152 million Euro. Mecom was forced to sell its publishing interests in Germany as well as Norway because of heavy debts.

Holger Friedrich and his wife Silke bought the Berliner Verlag in September 2019 from M. DuMont Schaumberg. This company published beside Berliner Zeitung also Berliner Kurier and Berliner Abendblatt. Friedrich wrote in the first number after he bought Berliner Zeitung, that their vision was to make politics and society more interesting again.

List of editors-in-chief

Notes

References

External links
 
  
 Berliner Zeitung online (text archive for related article)
 Open access archive of Berliner Zeitung / Berlin edition 21 May 1945 – 31 December 1990 in the portal DDR-Presse of the Zeitungsinformationssystem (ZEFYS) of the Berlin State Library; access via xlogon.net (registration needed)

1945 establishments in Germany
Daily newspapers published in Germany
Former state media
Mass media in East Germany
German-language newspapers
Newspapers published in Berlin
Newspapers established in 1945
German news websites